The Mur or Mura (Prekmurje Slovene: Müra or Möra) is a river in Central Europe rising in the Hohe Tauern national park of the Central Eastern Alps in Austria with its source being  above sea level. It is a tributary of the Drava and subsequently the Danube.

About 326 km are within the interior of Austria; 95 km flow in and around Slovenia (67 km along the borders with Austria and Croatia, 28 km inside Slovenia), and the rest forms the border between Croatia and Hungary. The largest city on the river is Graz, Austria.

Tributaries of the Mur include the Mürz, the Sulm, the Ščavnica, the Ledava and the Trnava.

Etymology
The river was attested as Maura in AD 799, Muora in 890, Mura in 1259, Mvr and Mver in 1310, and Muer in 1354. The name is probably of Slavic origin, nominalized from the adjective *murъ 'dark', meaning 'dark water'.

River course
The river rises in a remote valley within the Lungau region of Austrian state of Salzburg. The river flows eastwards through Tamsweg before crossing the border into the state of Styria.

From Unzmarkt the river continues in an easterly direction through the industrial towns of Leoben and Bruck an der Mur. At Bruck an der Mur the Mürz joins the Mur, which turns sharply south to flow through the city of Graz.

The river flows through the centre of Graz, passing underneath the Schloßberg and by the historic Inner City. As a result of being the European Capital of Culture for 2003, an artificial island known as the Murinsel was constructed in the middle of the river. Once heavily polluted by several paper mills on the shore and by the ironworks around Leoben, the water quality has improved since the 1980s and the river is now seen as an asset to the city.

From Graz the river continues to flow south, past the town of Leibnitz to its nearby confluence with the Sulm, where it adopts a more easterly course. Near Spielfeld, the river forms the border between Austria and Slovenia, a role it retains until just after the twin towns of Bad Radkersburg and Gornja Radgona, where it passes fully into Slovenia.

In Slovenia it passes the towns of Radenci, and Veržej. The river gives its name to the Slovenian region of Prekmurje (literally 'across the Mur') and the Croatian region of Međimurje (literally 'between the Mur'). Cable ferries and ship mills are still found in this area.

In the upper Međimurje area, in the western part of the region, the Mur floods and changes its course rather often, moving slowly toward the north on its left. Here, the biggest forest along the river, the Murščak, is located between Domašinec and Donji Hrašćan (derived from Croatian hrast 'oak'). After receiving its last significant tributary Trnava, the river ends near Legrad in Koprivnica-Križevci county, Croatia, where it flows into the river Drava.

Exploitation

Since the 4th century BC, there have been reports of floating mills powered by the streams of the river. The ancient technology was adopted later by arriving Slavs and then by Magyars. Several decades ago, in the 1920s and 1930s, many of these mills were still operating along the river. At least one of the old mills, the Babič Mill near Veržej, Slovenia, continues to operate to this day.

The Mur is known to carry small quantities of gold, not enough to be suitable for exploitation today, but this was a focus of activity for many people since ancient times. Organized research and exploitation of gold and other local resources was encouraged for the first time in 1772.

In Austria, several hydroelectric dams have been constructed for the production of electricity.

In 2017, a hydroelectric dam was under construction in Puntigam, a few km south of the Graz city centre. The plan includes a massive sewage pipe between the city centre and the new dam, necessitating the felling of thousands of trees. The project is controversial and environmental groups are resisting it. Both environmental impact and economic studies have found the project to be neither ecologically nor economically viable. Additional hydroelectric plants are planned for Slovenia.

Monitoring
The hydrological parameters of the Mur are regularly monitored in Croatia at Mursko Središće.

References

External links 
 
 Condition of Mur at Gornja Radgona and Petanjci - graphs, in the following order, of water level, flow and temperature data for the past 30 days (taken by ARSO)

 
 
Rivers of Salzburg (state)
Rivers of Styria
Rivers of Prekmurje
Rivers of Styria (Slovenia)
Rivers of Hungary
Rivers of Croatia
International rivers of Europe
Croatia–Hungary border
Austria–Slovenia border
Croatia–Slovenia border
Natura 2000 in Slovenia
Rivers of Austria
Border rivers